Amanda A. Gailey (born March 24, 1976) is an American academic and political activist. She is an associate professor of English at the University of Nebraska-Lincoln. Gailey authored Proofs of Genius in 2015.

Education 

Gailey did her undergraduate work at Phillips University and her graduate work at Creighton University and the University of Nebraska-Lincoln.

Career 
She worked at Washington University in St. Louis and the University of Georgia before joining the faculty at the University of Nebraska-Lincoln. Her work, including Proofs of Genius: Collected Editions from the American Revolution to the Digital Age, focuses on nineteenth-century American literature and textual studies.

Activism 

In 2017 Gailey participated in a protest of Turning Point USA, a national organization that maintains a “professor watch list.” A recruiter for the organization set up a table on the campus of the University of Nebraska-Lincoln, and Gailey held a sign that said “Turning Point: Please put me on your watch list.” Another protester, graduate student Courtney Lawton, eventually lost her job for her involvement in the protest, which led to the University being placed on the American Association of University Professors’ censure list for violating Lawton’s academic freedom and due process. Governor Pete Ricketts responded to the protest by taking the unprecedented step of rescinding Gailey’s and Lawton’s Nebraska Admiral awards, which received criticism as being politically vindictive.  The protest and response from politicians received considerable media attention, including an episode of This American Life called “My Effing First Amendment” that was broadcast on May 4, 2018.

As the founder and president of Nebraskans Against Gun Violence, Gailey threatened a boycott of First National Bank of Omaha unless the bank ceased its special credit card program with the National Rifle Association. Soon after the bank announced it was discontinuing the program, a number of other corporations also ended their special offers and programs with the gun rights group.

In 2018 Gailey and Catherine Koebel organized a protest Alexandria, Virginia, that targeted Chris W. Cox, who was then the chief lobbyist of the National Rifle Association. The protest was controversial for implicating Cox's wife's business and because the protesters held a graphic gunshot image on the public sidewalk in front of Cox's home.

Gailey contributes to the political blog Seeing Red Nebraska.

References

External links

Living people
1976 births
Place of birth missing (living people)
University of Nebraska–Lincoln faculty
Phillips University alumni
University of Nebraska–Lincoln alumni
Washington University in St. Louis faculty
University of Georgia faculty
21st-century American non-fiction writers
American women non-fiction writers
21st-century American women writers
American academics of English literature
American political activists
American gun control activists